The 2011 Tour of Austria was the 63rd edition of the Tour of Austria, an annual bicycle race. Departing from Dornbirn on July 3, it concluded in Vienna on July 10. The 1136.9 km long stage race was part of the 2010–2011 UCI Europe Tour, and was rated as a 2.HC event. Fredrik Kessiakoff of Astana won the general classification, his first title, and the first Swede to do so since 1957.

Teams
18 teams were invited to participate in the tour: 8 UCI ProTeams, 6 UCI Professional Continental Teams and 4 UCI Continental Teams.

Stages

Stage 1
3 July 2011 – Dornbirn to Götzis,

Stage 2
4 July 2011 – Innsbruck to Kitzbühel,

Stage 3
5 July 2011 – Kitzbühel to Prägraten am Großvenediger,

Stage 4
6 July 2011 – Matrei in Osttirol to Sankt Johann im Pongau/Alpendorf,

Stage 5
7 July 2011 – Sankt Johann im Pongau/Alpendorf to Schladming,

Stage 6
8 July 2011 – Hainburg an der Donau to Bruck an der Leitha,

Stage 7
9 July 2011 – Podersdorf am See to Podersdorf am See,  individual time trial (ITT)

Stage 8
10 July 2011 – Podersdorf am See to Vienna,

Classification leadership

Final standings

General classification

Points classification

Mountains classification

Young rider classification

Team classification

References
General
;Specific

External links

Tour of Austria
2011 in Austrian sport
Tour of Austria